Eyes For Africa Charity (EFA) is an organisation facilitating no-cost ophthalmic surgery for people living in regional Ethiopia who would otherwise have no access to this service. Eyes For Africa is a non-government, non-religious, not-for-profit organisation.

Eyes For Africa Charitable Foundation was established in 2007 and is a Registered Charity. Julie Tyers is its founder and principal driving force. Tyers is an ophthalmic nurse with over 30 years experience. She has also great experience from several trips with the College of Surgeons to Timor to assist with cataract operations there under an AUSAID funded project. In recognition of her work, Julie was honored to receive the Deakin University Leadership in Nursing Award for 2007.

Goals
EFA aims to travel to Africa twice a year and perform around 200 sight saving surgeries - (presently the focus is in Ethiopia)
To develop a lasting improvement in health services by supporting the training and development of local staff in the countries visited.
To build a quality organisation through building relationships with key personnel to enable cost-effective eye care.
To develop a reputation for delivering quality eye care and communicating this positive impact to financial and other contributors.

Programs
2010 will see Eyes For Africa's 4th visit to Ethiopia 
Eyes For Africa is sponsoring a surgical trainee (including small incision extra capsular excision surgery) at Jimma University, Ethiopia

References

External links 

www.ju.edu.et/index.php
www.bendigoadvertiser.com.au/news/local/news/general/bendigo-nurses-ethiopia-trip-provides-perspective/2061520.aspx
web.archive.org/web/20110726125109/http://www.orbis.org/Default.aspx?cid=5712
www.heraldsun.com.au/news/more-news/the-look-of-love-after-years-of-darkness/story-fn7x8me2-1226114507446

Health charities in Australia
Foreign charities operating in Ethiopia